Unapdev located in foothills of Satpuda hills range, Unapdev is one of holy remote place at a distance of  from Adavad village in Chopda taluka of Jalgaon District in Maharashtra state of India. 

Hot water fountain is one of the key attractions of Unapdev tourist place. Like Unapdev, Sunapdev and Nijhardev are two other hot water breezes generated in Satpuda hills range. All these three places have special mention in ancient Ramayana and had auspicious touch of Lord Rama during his fourteen years expulsion from Ayodhya. 

The hot water flows throughout the year from the mouth of a godly cow and is another factor of attraction for tourist visiting this spot. The uniquely constant temperature of the hot water has healing effects on skin ailments. The ancient stories say that 'This hot water breeze was generated by Lord Rama for Sharbhang rishi having faced torments from evils.

Khandesh's deity Manudevi, Shiragad's Amba Bhavani Goddesses are other two sacred places in nearby Yaval Taluka.
The word 'Un-ap' means hot water and in Khandesh's Ahirani language 'Vuna Dev' stands for the almighty that generated this fountain.

Approach 
The nearest railway station is Jalgaon

References 

Hill stations in Maharashtra
Tourist attractions in Jalgaon district
Hot springs of India
Landforms of Maharashtra